Bursa natalensis is a species of sea snail, a marine gastropod mollusk in the family Bursidae, the frog shells.

Description
The maximum recorded shell length is 84.7 mm.

Habitat
Minimum recorded depth is 40 m. Maximum recorded depth is 780 m.

References

Bursidae
Gastropods described in 1970